Jack Massey may refer to:
Jack Massey (politician) (1885–1964), New Zealand politician of the Reform Party and then the National Party
Jack Massey (footballer) (1887–1981), Australian rules footballer
Jack C. Massey (1904–1990), American venture capitalist and entrepreneur
Jack Massey (boxer) (born 1993), English boxer

See also 
 John Massey (disambiguation)